The Diary of an Old Man is a 2015 drama film directed by Bernard Émond. It is based on the Anton Chekhov short story "A Dreary Story" (alternatively titled in English "A Boring Story" or "A Dull Story").

The film was shot at the Université de Montréal Faculty of Medicine and elsewhere in Greater Montreal over 27 days in February, April, and May 2014.

The film premiered at the inaugural Berlin Critics' Week (a series of screenings, organized by the German Film Critics Association, running parallel to the Berlin Film Festival).

The film received one Jutra nomination, for lead actor Paul Savoie. Savoie won the award for Best Performance in a Borsos Competition Film at the Whistler Film Festival.

See also
 An Uneventful Story, Polish film based on the same short story

References

External links
official site

2015 films
Films directed by Bernard Émond
Canadian drama films
French-language Canadian films
2010s Canadian films